The International Day of Prayer for the Persecuted Church (often abbreviated as IDOP) is an observance within the Christian calendar in which congregations pray for Christians who are persecuted for their faith. It falls on the first Sunday of November, within the liturgical period of Allhallowtide, which is dedicated to remembering the martyrs and saints of Christianity. The International Day of Prayer for the Persecuted Church is observed by many Christian denominations, with over 100,000 congregations honoring the holiday worldwide. Congregations focus on "praying for individuals, families, churches, or countries where Christians are facing hard situations." Additionally, many congregations donate funds from their collection of tithes and offerings on the International Day of Prayer for the Persecuted Church to NGOs that support human rights of persecuted Christians, such as Voice of the Martyrs, International Christian Concern, and Open Doors.

History  

The persecution of Christians has increased in the modern era. At the present moment, Christians are the most persecuted religious group in the world. 

The International Day of Prayer for the Persecuted Church originated in the 20th century to raise awareness of the increasing violence, torture, death, "worship restrictions, public humiliation, and social isolation" that some Christians face in atheist states, such as in North Korea, as well as in South Asia and the Middle East; the observance was spearheaded by the World Evangelical Alliance, United States Conference of Catholic Bishops, and Southern Baptist Convention. It has since been observed in many Christian denominations, such as the United Methodist Church and certain Catholic parishes. The International Day of Prayer for the Persecuted Church falls on the first Sunday of November, within the liturgical period of Allhallowtide, which is dedicated to remembering the martyrs and saints of Christianity.

The November observance has been promulgated by many NGOs that champion human rights for Christians, including Voice of the Martyrs, Open Doors, and International Christian Concern. Victims of persecution, including believers and missionaries, have also advocated to spread the International Day of Prayer for the Persecuted Church.

See also 

List of Christian human rights non-governmental organisations
Priest Barracks of Dachau Concentration Camp 
Dachau Concentration  Camp,  Dachau, Bavaria,  Nazi Germany,  1939-1945
List of prisoners of Dachau 
Martyrs of the Spanish Civil War,  1931-1939
Day of the Christian Martyr
Demolition of al-Baqi
Destruction of early Islamic heritage sites in Saudi Arabia     
Destruction of cultural heritage by ISIL
Day of Sorrow                      
Antireligious campaigns in China
Asia Bibi blasphemy case
Persecution of Christians in the Eastern Bloc
World Day of Prayer

References

External links 
International Day of Prayer for the Persecuted Church - Voice of the Martyrs
International Day of Prayer for the Persecuted Church New Zealand - Voice of the Martyrs New Zealand
International Day of Prayer for the Persecuted Church - Open Doors
International Day of Prayer for the Persecuted Church - International Christian Concern

Christian prayer
Allhallowtide
Observances honoring the dead
November observances
Saints days
Persecution of Christians
Christian Sunday observances